Xitieshan railway station is a station on the Chinese Qingzang Railway. It is located in Haixi Mongol and Tibetan Autonomous Prefecture, in the eastern part of the Qaidam Basin.

A short branch rail line runs from Xiteshan railway station to the nearby Xitieshan Lead Mine (锡铁山铅矿;

See also

 Qingzang Railway
 List of stations on Qingzang railway

Railway stations in Qinghai
Stations on the Qinghai–Tibet Railway
Haixi Mongol and Tibetan Autonomous Prefecture